Silvia Doblado Peña is a Spanish football midfielder, currently playing for Granadilla in the Primera División.

Club career

On 15 June 2011, Doblado transferred from Las Palmas to Sporting de Huelva. Prior to this, she had already played league football for Sevilla and Barcelona. In 2013, she signed for Granadilla, and in doing so, was part of their inaugural squad. In 2021, having played more than 150 games for the Canarian club and participated in their promotion to the Primera División in 2015, Doblado renewed her contracted with Granadilla.

International career

As an under-19 international she won the 2004 U-19 European Championship and played the subsequent World Championship. In 2012, she was called up to train with Spain's senior team at La Ciudad del Fútbol.

References

External links
 

1987 births
Living people
Spanish women's footballers
Primera División (women) players
FC Barcelona Femení players
Sporting de Huelva players
UD Granadilla Tenerife players
Women's association football defenders
Women's association football midfielders
Footballers from Las Palmas
Spain women's youth international footballers
21st-century Spanish women